Khvajeh Mohammad Kujuji Tabrizi, better known by his later title of Amir Zakariya, was a Persian bureaucrat from the Kujuji family, who served as the vizier of the Safavid shah (king) Ismail I from 1501 to 1507.

References

Sources 
 
 
 

15th-century Iranian politicians
16th-century Iranian politicians
Officials of the Aq Qoyunlu
16th-century deaths
Grand viziers of the Safavid Empire
16th-century people of Safavid Iran
Politicians from Tabriz
Kujuji family